The go card is an electronic smartcard ticketing system developed by Cubic Corporation, which is currently used on the TransLink public transport network in South East Queensland. To use the go card, users hold the card less than 10 cm away from the reader to "touch on" before starting a journey, and must do the same to "touch off" the service at the end of the journey. The cost of each journey is deducted from the go card balance.

The Queensland Government awarded the $134 million contract to design, build, operate and maintain the go card system to Cubic Corporation in July 2003. In July 2006, TransLink signed up around 1,000 volunteers to trial the new smartcard system in the Redcliffe area. The go card was launched throughout Brisbane in February 2008, the go card was available at selected retail stores and Queensland Rail stations. It could also be accessed by phone or online.

History
The go card was a major part of the Queensland Government's integrated ticketing system to improve the efficiency and convenience of public transport. In July 2003, the Queensland Government awarded the $134 million contract to design, build, operate and maintain the go card system to Cubic Corporation.

Trial Period
Following the development of the go card, in July 2006, TransLink signed up around 1,000 volunteers to test out the new smartcard system in the Redcliffe area. TransLink installed the new smartcard equipment in Hornibrook Bus Lines and later Brisbane Transport buses. Sunbus' bus fleet also underwent pre-wiring so onboard equipment could be installed later. TransLink also installed new smartcard fare machines at Petrie, Sandgate, Brunswick Street, Central and Roma Street stations.

Rollout
The go card was launched throughout Brisbane in February 2008. The system covers an area of 10,000 km2 and is available on 2,200 buses; at 153 train stations, 24 ferry wharves and 19 light rail stops.

The system continues to grow, with Cubic supplying ticketing equipment for the Gold Coast light rail system; the new rail line and stations at Springfield in Brisbane; and the extension of the ferry service to the Southern Moreton Bay Islands.

The go card can be purchased and topped up at retail stores and Queensland rail stations. It can also be accessed by phone or online. During the launch, TransLink had staff on hand at rail stations and major bus interchanges to talk to passengers about go card and answer any questions.

To encourage the use of the go card, from 4 August 2008 all go card trips received a minimum 20% discount off paper tickets. Regular users who travel more than 10 journeys within a week received an additional discount of 50% off the price of any extra journeys.

On 4 January 2010, to encourage the use of the go cards during 2010, TransLink gave away 400,000 free go cards loaded with $10 credit. go cards users also received off-peak discounts and automatic top-up.

Originally, TransLink had proposed to scrap paper-based ticketing entirely, but following controversy over this proposal single-trip paper tickets were retained, whilst other paper ticket formats (weekly, monthly, daily and off-peak) were abolished. Apart from frequent user schemes, periodic ticketing formats have not been introduced for go card since its inception.

As a further incentive, fare restructuring saw go card users offered substantial discounts in single fares over the price of paper tickets. In November 2015, Cubic was awarded a three-year contract extension until 2019.

SEEQ Card
In 2012, TransLink launched a new SEEQ Card targeting tourists. The SEEQ Card operates similarly to the go card, but includes:
 unlimited travel within the TransLink region for a duration of 3 or 5 consecutive days from the first trip (depending on the card type)
 Adult or Child fare classes (no Concession or Seniors cards)
 expiry 12 months after the date of purchase if not used
 2 trips to/from Brisbane Domestic or International Airports via the Airport line

Go Explore Card 
In 2014, TransLink launched the go explore card – Australia's first ever limited-use tourist smartcard – to coincide with the official opening of the $1.2 billion Gold Coast light rail system.

Developed to make travel easier for tourists and visitors to the Gold Coast, the go explore card uses the same technology as the go card and works with the ticketing equipment installed at the 16 new light rail stations, 40 Add Vending Machines and 138 standalone validators.

The go explore card offers visitors unlimited travel on any TransLink bus or light rail service on the Gold Coast for just $10 a day and $5 for children. It can be reloaded with up to 8-day passes at any one time.

Go Access Vision Impaired Travel Pass (VITP)
In 2015, TransLink launched a new dual purpose travel card for people with visual impairment.

Developed in consultation with Vision Australia and Guide Dogs Queensland, the go access VITP uses smartcard technology to open fare gates at train stations without the assistance of a station staff member and has raised tactile elements to help vision-impaired customers identify the card.

VITP holders are entitled to free travel across all TransLink services, qconnect buses in regional Queensland and on other services provided by participating interstate transport operators.

Go Access Corporate Events Card
In 2016, TransLink introduced the go access Corporate Events Card. The go access Corporate Events card is a ticketing solution for conference and event organisers to provide easy travel for delegates around South East Queensland, via the TransLink network. For $12, the card allows unlimited travel for three days across bus, train, ferry and tram services.

Usage

Fare Types

The go card is available in Adult, Child, Concession and Seniors fare types:
 Adult is for use by passengers without concessions. Tertiary students, job seekers and asylum seekers will need to have an adult go card to have concession fares activated on the card.
 Child is for use by children under the age of 15 years. 
 Concession is for use by passengers entitled to a concession, such as secondary students, holders of a Pensioner Concession Card, and holders of a Repatriation Health Card.
 Seniors is for use by passengers who have a Queensland Seniors Card issued by the Queensland Government.
 Seniors+go incorporates the Queensland Seniors Card and go card having them displayed on both sides.

Fare Calculation
When purchasing a go card, a refundable deposit is applied, on top of the starting balance. The deposit allows users to finish their journey even when they have insufficient funds on the go card, although the go card has to have a positive balance at the start of the journey.

To use the go card, users need to hold their card less than 10 cm away from the reader to "touch on" and do the same to "touch off" at the end of each journey or segment travelled (This includes switching between Train and Light Rail at Helensvale Station).

For inter-modal travel, TransLink allows go card users to transfer between services (up to 3 times and within 3 and a half hours) without being regarded as having started a new journey.

The fare is calculated and deducted from the go card balance each time the user touches off, based on the number of zones travelled through since the first segment of the journey. On a transfer segment, the user is only charged the difference between the amount already charged and the total fare for the journey.

Users who do not "touch off" are charged a fixed amount which varies depending on the mode of travel. In the event of inadvertent error, technical faults or other excusable circumstances, penalty fares can be adjusted via the TransLink website (for registered go cards) or telephone call centre.

Originally there were 23 zones radiating out from the Brisbane central business district. On 19 December 2016, these were consolidated into eight zones.

Incentives
Peak and off-peak is used by TransLink to encourage passengers to travel during non-busy hours. TransLink does this by offering discounts to passengers for travelling during off-peak hours. Peak is from 06:00 to 08:30 and 15:30 to 19:00 weekdays, except public holidays, while off-peak is from 08:30 to 15:30 and after 19:00 weekdays until 06:00 the following day and all day weekends and gazetted public holidays. To qualify for off-peak, the journey or segment must be commenced during the off-peak period. If a journey straddles the peak and off-peak periods, the system calculates the fare for the segment travelled using the touch on time period for the calculation.

Under the current frequent user scheme, go card users are able to travel at 50% after completing eight journeys in a week (Monday through to Sunday). The previous frequent user scheme offered free trips after nine trips travelled in a given week.

Infrastructure

Sale and Top-up Points
The go card is available for purchase at more than 680 locations, with top up services for existing go cards available at 1600 south-East Queensland locations. These locations include staffed Queensland Rail Station ticket offices, fare machines at busways, key bus interchanges, train stations and tram stations, 7 Eleven stores and on board Brisbane CityCats and CityFerries. Selected bus operators are also able to top-up cards on board, although this is not implemented on services operated by Brisbane Transport.

In 2014, TransLink was able to expand the go card retail network, using Cubic's NextLink technology. The Transport and Main Roads innovative technological solution, saw go card services integrated with point-of-sale equipment at all 7-Eleven convenience and fuel outlets. This made an additional 75 locations available to sell, top up and expiry change services for go card and go explore..

Users who register their go card online have access to an online portal to enable them to perform automatic and manual top-ups via credit card, report fare issues, maintain their details and download transaction histories. Further, the balance of registered cards can be permanently transferred to another card and the account balance can be frozen if the go card is reported as lost or stolen. TransLink also operates a phone hotline for customer service, card top-ups and enquiries.

Card Readers

Card readers are installed on each bus and ferry operating within the TransLink network. On the Queensland Rail network, card readers are located at each train station, rather than on each train and the same applies to the G:Link tram network located on the Gold Coast which have card readers located at each tram station. 
 
Authorised Officers are equipped with portable card readers.

Contactless Payments 
TransLink is running a trial on G:link with support for contactless payments via Visa, Mastercard and American Express. By the end of 2021, it is expected that contactless payment will be supported on all heavy rail stations. Currently, contactless payments only allow for adult fares, although this is expected to be rectified in the future.

CityCycle Scheme integration
In March 2012, the then opposition transport spokesman, Scott Emerson, proposed that a Liberal National Party government if elected would consider integrating go cards with the Brisbane City Council/JCDecaux-operated CityCycle bicycle hire scheme. A similar proposal had previously been rejected by the incumbent Labor government in January 2012.
From November 2012, CityCycle subscribers can link a go card account to a CityCycle account, which also operates on a smart-card based system. However, the current integration does not yet allow bicycle hire charges to be deducted from the go card account balance.

Reception

Uptake
TransLink publishes reporting of the usage and uptake of go card in its annual reports.

go card is the most widely used ticketing product on the TransLink network, representing 87% of all trips taken in the quarter ended June 2016.

Security
In 2008, security experts found the cloning of a go card is possible - though no verified instances have yet been discovered, which allow people to clone and use other people's go cards. TransLink has indicated that systems exist to detect fraudulent activity and reject cloned cards, however no details about these systems are available.

In January 2010, in a move to encourage the use of the go card, TransLink changed the fare structure by increasing the price of paper tickets to make the go card cheaper than paper tickets. In some cases the increase was as much as 40%. Although more users were using the go card than before, the move created another issue given the limited number of train stations selling the go card at the time. Some users could not buy the go card and had to continue to use paper tickets with higher fares. In response, TransLink confirmed more stations would begin selling the go card.

TransLink fares continued a trend of "planned" increases by a factor of 15% per year in the 2010, 2011 and 2012 calendar years, sparking concerns about affordability. From 2013 the "planned" increase halved to 7.5%. Currently, go card fares are 30% cheaper than paper-based ticket pricing.

In March 2010, a loophole was discovered that allowed go card users to avoid fares on buses by "touching off" at the back door after touching on at the first door, TransLink confirmed that doing this would waive the fare.

See also

myki - Melbourne's smartcard system
Opal card - Sydney's smartcard ticketing system
SmartRider - Perth's smartcard system

References

External links
TransLink - go card
TransLink

Contactless smart cards
Fare collection systems in Australia
Public transport in Brisbane
Public transport on the Gold Coast, Queensland
2006 introductions